James Ross Donaldson (born 19 October 1975) is a Welsh professional golfer who plays on the European Tour.

Professional career
Donaldson was born in Pontypridd. He turned professional in 2000. Having failed to come through the European Tour's qualifying school, in 2001 he played predominantly on the second tier Challenge Tour. He won the BMW Russian Open and the Telia Grand Prix in Sweden on his way to second place in the Challenge Tour Rankings. He also made the most of limited opportunities on the elite tour, making five cuts from seven events, with two top ten finishes, as he ended the season inside the top 100 on the Order of Merit to earn his European Tour card for 2002.

Donaldson spent the next few years playing on the European Tour, reaching a best of 58th on the final Order of Merit in 2003, but began to be troubled by back problems in 2004. In 2007 he was back on the Challenge Tour, but showed a return to form, picking up his third Challenge Tour win at the Abierto Telefonica de Guatemala on his way to 4th place on the end of season rankings. He was back on the European Tour in 2008 and was again inside the top 100 on the Order of Merit to maintain his playing rights for the 2009 season.

He has since performed consistently, finishing in the top 50 on the Order of Merit in both 2010 and 2011.

On 1 July 2012, Donaldson won his maiden European Tour title at The Irish Open at Royal Portrush, finishing 4 strokes ahead of three other players. Donaldson had held a two stroke advantage after 54 holes and pressed ahead earlier during his round with birdies at 2, 3 and 4. Despite two dropped shots on 11 and 16, he found five more birdies on the back nine to finish with a 66 and clinch the title. His first victory came at the 255th attempt and also made him the 10th Welshman to taste success on the European Tour.

Donaldson finished T7 at the 2012 PGA Championship. He finished the season ranked 19th on the Race to Dubai and he plans to join the PGA Tour for the 2013 season. The 2013 season will also mark Donaldson's first appearance at the Masters; he earned entry after finishing 2012 season ranked 47th in the Official World Golf Ranking.

In his second start of the 2013 season and thirteen events after his maiden victory, Donaldson won his second European Tour title at the Abu Dhabi HSBC Golf Championship. Starting the final round two back of Justin Rose, Donaldson made five birdies in seventeen holes to move two clear of the field, but a late bogey at the par five 18th hole meant a nervous wait to watch the final group come home. First Thorbjørn Olesen, then Rose had putts to force a playoff but both missed narrowly to see Donaldson to victory by one stroke. With the win, Donaldson became only the seventh Welshman to win multiple titles on the European Tour and it moved him inside the top 30 of the Official World Golf Ranking for the first time in his career. On 11 April, he became the fifth man in history to record a hole-in-one on the 6th hole at Augusta National Golf Club during the 2013 Masters Tournament. He finished the 2013 season ranked 5th on the Race to Dubai.

Donaldson played well enough on the 2014 PGA Tour as a non-member to earn a PGA Tour card for the 2014–15 season.

Donaldson secured the winning point for Europe in the 2014 Ryder Cup, with a wedge shot onto the 15th green, beating Keegan Bradley 4 & 3.

Just three years later, Donaldson was on the verge of losing his European Tour card. However, he finished fourth in the final event, the Andalucía Valderrama Masters, to move inside the top 101 of the Race to Dubai standings to secure his playing rights for the 2018 season.

Amateur wins (2)
1997 Welsh Amateur Championship
2000 Welsh Amateur Open Stroke Play Championship

Professional wins (8)

European Tour wins (3)

Asian Tour wins (1)

Challenge Tour wins (3)

1Co-sanctioned by the Tour de las Américas

Challenge Tour playoff record (1–0)

Other wins (1)

Results in major championships
Results not in chronological order in 2020.

CUT = missed the half-way cut
WD = withdrew
"T" = tied
NT = No tournament due to the COVID-19 pandemic

Summary

Most consecutive cuts made – 2 (four times)
Longest streak of top-10s – 1

Results in The Players Championship

"T" indicates a tie for a place

Results in World Golf Championships
Results not in chronological order before 2015.

QF, R16, R32, R64 = Round in which player lost in match play
"T" = tied

Team appearances
Amateur
European Youths' Team Championship (representing Wales): 1996
European Amateur Team Championship (representing Wales): 1997, 1999
Bonallack Trophy (representing Europe): 1998 (winners)
Eisenhower Trophy (representing Great Britain & Ireland): 2000
St Andrews Trophy (representing Great Britain & Ireland): 2000 (winners)

Professional
World Cup (representing Wales): 2009, 2011
Seve Trophy (representing Great Britain & Ireland): 2011 (winners), 2013
EurAsia Cup (representing Europe): 2014
Ryder Cup (representing Europe): 2014 (winners)

See also
2007 Challenge Tour graduates

References

External links

Welsh male golfers
European Tour golfers
PGA Tour golfers
Ryder Cup competitors for Europe
Sportspeople from Pontypridd
Sportspeople from Macclesfield
1975 births
Living people